Over the Top is an album by British rock drummer Cozy Powell. It was Powell's first solo album, and it featured many well-known musicians playing alongside him.

Track listing
"Theme One" (George Martin) – 3:36
"Killer" (Don Airey) – 7:16
"Heidi Goes to Town" (Cozy Powell, Airey) – 2:57
"El Sid" (Bernie Marsden) – 5:09
"Sweet Poison" (Max Middleton) – 8:24
"The Loner" (Dedicated to Jeff Beck) (Middleton) – 4:50
"Over the Top" (Airey, Powell, Pyotr Tchaikovsky) – 8:39

The Polydor Years Bonus Tracks

"Over The Top (Single Edit)" – 3:21
"The Loner (Single Edit)" – 3:10
"Heidi Goes To Town (#1)" – 2:59
"Heidi Goes To Town (#2)" – 2:59
"Sweet Poison (#1 Lead & Rhythm Guitars)" – 6:30
"Sweet Poison (#2 Rhythm Guitars)" – 6:30
"Sweet Poison (#3 Backing Tracks, No Guitar)" – 6:30
"The Loner (#1 Lead Guitar)" – 4:52

Personnel
Cozy Powell – drums
Gary Moore – guitar (track 2)
Clem Clempson – guitar (tracks 5, 6)
Bernie Marsden – guitar (track 4)
Jack Bruce – bass guitar
Don Airey – keyboards (except track 6)
Max Middleton – keyboards (track 6)

Album credits
Produced and engineered by Martin Birch.
Mastered by Ian Cooper of Utopia Sounds
Tape ops Lou Broglia and Alan Douglas.
Recorded at Central Sound and Track 2 at The Town House, London.
Mixed at The Town House.
All tracks arranged by Don Airey.
Photography: Bob Carlos Clarke
Art Direction and artwork: Ian Murray/Acrobat Design Ltd.
Cover concept: Cozy Powell
Max Middleton appears courtesy of Epic Records.
Gary Moore appears courtesy of MCA Records.
Bernie Marsden appears courtesy of United Artists Records
Cozy Powell appears courtesy of Swindon Town Football Club.
Thanks to: Roger Glover, Neil Murray, Tchaikovsky, Terry Yeardon and Silverstone.
Co-ordination: Bobby Adcock (LFC)
Management: Bruce Payne
Mr Powell's drums by Yamaha, his cymbals by Paiste.
This album was recorded without a safety net.
Lyrics enclosed.  (This statement was tongue-in-cheek, as Over the Top is an all-instrumental album)

1979 debut albums
Albums produced by Martin Birch
Polydor Records albums
Cozy Powell albums